Beyond The Tank is an American reality television companion spin-off series on ABC, which followed up on aspiring entrepreneurs who made business presentations to a panel of potential investors on Shark Tank. The show premiered on May 1, 2015, and was picked up for 10 episodes, but only three episodes aired. It was renewed for a second season on May 7, 2015, which premiered on January 5, 2016, before airing in its regular time slot on January 12, 2016. Additional episodes aired in March 2016 after ABC cancelled Of Kings and Prophets.

Premise 
Each episode follows up with entrepreneurs who appeared on Shark Tank. The show does not focus exclusively on successful entrepreneurs; several segments have featured entrepreneurs whose deals with the "Sharks" failed, while others focus on entrepreneurs who did not receive investments.

Episodes

Series overview

Season 1 (2015)

Season 2 (2016)

References

External links 

 
 
 

Shark Tank
American Broadcasting Company original programming
2015 American television series debuts
2016 American television series endings
2010s American reality television series
English-language television shows
Television series by Sony Pictures Television
Television series by MGM Television
Reality television spin-offs
Business-related television series
Television shows featuring audio description
American television spin-offs